In group theory, geometry, representation theory and molecular geometry, a symmetry operation is a geometric transformation of an object that leaves the object looking the same after it has been carried out. For example, as transformations of an object in space, rotations, reflections and inversions are all symmetry operations. Such symmetry operations are performed with respect to symmetry elements (for example, a point, line or plane). In the context of molecular symmetry, a symmetry operation is a permutation of atoms such that the molecule or crystal is transformed into a state indistinguishable from the starting state.
Two basic facts follow from this definition, which emphasizes its usefulness.
 Physical properties must be invariant with respect to symmetry operations.
 Symmetry operations can be collected together in groups which are isomorphic to permutation groups.
In the context of molecular symmetry, quantum wavefunctions need not be invariant, because the operation can multiply them by a phase or mix states within a degenerate representation, without affecting any physical property.

Molecules

Identity Operation  
The identity operation corresponds to doing nothing to the object. Because every molecule is indistinguishable from itself if nothing is done to it, every object possesses at least the identity operation. In the identity operation, no change can be observed for the molecule. Even the most asymmetric molecule possesses the identity operation. The need for such an identity operation arises from the mathematical requirements of group theory.

Reflection through mirror planes 

The reflection operation is carried out with respect to symmetry elements known as planes of symmetry or mirror planes. Its orientation relative to the principal axis of the molecule is indicated by a subscript. The plane must pass through the molecule and cannot be completely outside it.

If the plane of symmetry contains the principal axis of the molecule (i.e., the molecular -axis), it is designated as a vertical mirror plane, which is indicated by a subscript .
If the plane of symmetry is perpendicular to the principal axis, it is designated as a horizontal mirror plane, which is indicated by a subscript .
If the plane of symmetry bisects the angle between two 2-fold axes perpendicular to the principal axis, it is designated as a dihedral mirror plane, which is indicated by a subscript  .

Through the reflection of each mirror plane, the molecule must be able to produce an identical image of itself.

Inversion operation 

In an inversion through a centre of symmetry,  (the element), we imagine taking each point in a molecule and then moving it out the same distance on the other side. In summary, the inversion operation projects each atom through the centre of inversion and out to the same distance on the opposite side. The inversion center is a point in space that lies in the geometric center of the molecule. As a result, all the cartesian coordinates of the atoms are inverted (i.e.  to ).

Examples of molecules that have an inversion center include certain molecules with octahedral geometry (general formula ), square planar geometry (general formula ), and ethylene. Examples of molecules without inversion centers are  cyclopentadienide and molecules with trigonal pyramidal geometry (general formula ).

Proper rotation operations or n-fold rotation 
A proper rotation refers to simple rotation about an axis. The superscript  is omitted if it is equal to one.  is a rotation through 360°, where .

Here the molecule can be rotated into equivalent positions around an axis. An example of a molecule with  symmetry is the water molecule. If the  molecule is rotated by 180° about an axis passing through the oxygen atom, no detectable difference before and after the  operation is observed. 

Order  of an axis can be regarded as a number of times that, for the least rotation which gives an equivalent configuration, that rotation must be repeated to give a configuration identical to the original structure (i.e. a 360° or 2 rotation). Therefore,  is an order of three, and is often referred to as a threefold axis.

Improper rotation operations 

An improper rotation involves two operation steps: a proper rotation followed by reflection through a plane perpendicular to the rotation axis. The improper rotation is represented by the symbol  where  is the order. When  is an even number  but when  is odd 

Rotation axes, mirror planes and inversion centres are  symmetry elements, not symmetry operations. The rotation axis of the highest order is known as the principal rotation axis. It is conventional to set the Cartesian -axis of the molecule to contain the principal rotation axis.

Examples 

Dichloromethane, . There is a  rotation axis which passes through the carbon atom and the midpoints between the two hydrogen atoms and the two chlorine atoms. Define the z axis as co-linear with the  axis, the  plane  as containing  and the   plane as containing . A  rotation operation permutes the two hydrogen atoms  and the two chlorine atoms. Reflection in the  plane permutes the hydrogen atoms while reflection in the  plane permutes the chlorine atoms. Note that if any two operations are carried out in succession the result is the same as if a single operation of the group had been performed.

Methane, . In addition to the proper rotations of order 2 and 3 there are three mutually perpendicular  axes which pass half-way between the C-H bonds and six mirror planes. Note that

Crystals 

In crystals, screw rotations and/or glide reflections are additionally possible. These are rotations or reflections together with partial translation. These operations may change based on the dimensions of the crystal lattice.

The Bravais lattices may be considered as representing translational symmetry operations. Combinations of operations of the crystallographic point groups with the addition symmetry operations produce the 230 crystallographic space groups.

See also 
Molecular symmetry

Crystal structure

Crystallographic restriction theorem

References 
F. A. Cotton Chemical applications of group theory, Wiley, 1962, 1971

Physical chemistry
Symmetry